Frank H. Williams (10 March 1906 – 1982) was a Welsh footballer who played for Wrexham, Preston North End, Port Vale, Oswestry Town, Northern Nomads, Ashton National Gas, Altrincham, Shrewsbury Town and Buxton.

Career
Williams played for Wrexham and Preston North End, before joining Second Division side Port Vale in March 1928. His only appearance was at outside-right in a 4–1 defeat to Wolverhampton Wanderers at The Old Recreation Ground on 25 August. This proved to be his only appearance of the 1928–29 season, and he left on a free transfer in May 1929 and later played for Oswestry Town, Northern Nomads, Ashton National Gas, Altrincham, Shrewsbury Town and Buxton.

Career statistics
Source:

References

Sportspeople from Flintshire
Welsh footballers
Association football wingers
Wrexham A.F.C. players
Preston North End F.C. players
Northern Nomads F.C. players
Port Vale F.C. players
Oswestry Town F.C. players
Altrincham F.C. players
Shrewsbury Town F.C. players
Buxton F.C. players
Ashton National F.C. players
English Football League players
1906 births
1982 deaths